Phephana is a constituency of the Uttar Pradesh Legislative Assembly covering the city of Phephana in the Ballia district of Uttar Pradesh, India.

Phephana is one of five assembly constituencies in the Lok Sabha constituency of Ballia. Since 2008, this assembly constituency is numbered 360 amongst 403 constituencies.

Election results

2022

2017
Bharatiya Janta Party candidate Upendra Tiwari won in last Assembly election of 2017 Uttar Pradesh Legislative Elections defeating Bahujan Samaj Party candidate Ambika Choudhary by a margin of 17,897 votes.

Members of Legislative Assembly

References

External links
 

Assembly constituencies of Uttar Pradesh
Ballia district